"Hands of the Clock" was a hit for Canadian band Life in 1969. It was written and produced by Neil Sheppard.

Background
The group's debut single, "Hands of the Clock" bw "Ain't I Told You Before" was released on Polydor 540.009 in 1969. Both sides were written by Neil Sheppard.  With a strong response to the single in the United States, it was noted in the September, 1969 issue of Billboard that it would be released in England on Polydor.

Charts
The single was in the Recommended Canadian Content section of RPM Weekly on May 26th. It was also picking up in Montreal and Ontario. By June 9th it was charting, having just entered the Canadian Content Chart at #9. It also made its entry into the RPM100 Chart at the #100 spot.
By July 14th, the group appeared on the RPM Weekly cover. Their single was also at its second week at #4 on the RPM Canadian Content Chart. It had also moved up from #48 to #43 on the RPM100 Chart. 

Stateside it was making some progress  an Billboard wrote in the August 2 issue that "Hands of the Clock" by Life, "Laughing" by The Guess Who and "When I Die" by Motherlode were three Canadian produced singles that were either in the Billboard "Hot Hundred" or "Bubbling Under".

The song eventually got to #19 on Canada's RPM chart.

References

1969 songs
1969 singles